Self Exile is the third album by progressive metal band Wastefall.

Track listing
 Intro (1:05)
 Willow Man (4:04)
 The Muzzle Affection (5:26)
 Dance of Descent (3:36)
 Another Empty Haven (5:54)
 Strife for Definition (4:49)
 Sleepwalk (4:37)
 E.Y.E. (Eternal Yearning Entities) (4:44)
 Utopia Fragmented (6:42)
 4 Minutes to Abandon (3:55)
 Provoke the Divine (6:13)

Total Time: 51:07

Reception

Alex Henderson of AllMusic said that Self Exile had catchy songs despite being "slightly inconsistent". On the other hand, Metal Storm recommended the album for listeners of progressive metal.

References

2006 albums
Wastefall albums